A wall sit is an exercise done to strengthen the quadriceps muscles. A similar physical activity is known as the jetliner position. The exercise is characterized by the two right angles formed by the body, one at the hips and one at the knees. The person wall sitting places their back against a wall with their feet shoulder-width apart and a little ways out from the wall. Then, keeping their back against the wall, they lower their hips until their knees form right angles. This is a very intense work out for the quadriceps muscles and it can be very painful to hold this position for extended periods.  Wall sits are used as a primary strengthening exercise in many sports requiring strong quadriceps like fencing, ice hockey, sailing (mostly small boat racing), skiing and track and field.
This exercise is also used as a disciplinary activity in the armed forces.  It takes up little space, and can be administered easily in classroom settings to misbehaving soldiers-in-training.

Method 
 The participant should lean against the wall with their feet planted firmly on the ground, shoulder-width apart. Their feet should also be about two feet away from the wall (though the optimal distance will be somewhat dependent on the participant's height).
 Once in such a position, the participant should slowly slide down the wall with their back pressed against it until their legs are bent at a right angle. This angle is very crucial because if the thighs are not parallel to the ground, the quadriceps will be bearing less load and the effectiveness of the exercise will be diminished.
 The participant's knees should also be directly above their ankles and their back should be touching the wall at all times.
 Depending on the participant's strength, they should hold the position for 20 seconds to a minute (or longer for more advanced athletes). If performing multiple repetitions of the exercise (three is often a recommended number), the participant should rest for half a minute in between to allow their muscles to recuperate.
 As the participant gains strength, they can increase their holding time by small increments such as 10 seconds. While a burning feeling in the quadriceps muscles is normal, if the participant feels even a little pain in their knee or kneecap, they should be advised to immediately stop the activity.
 The participant can hold a medicine ball or dumbbell while they sit to increase the intensity.

Benefits 
Wall sitting primarily builds isometric strength and endurance in glutes, calves, quadriceps, hamstrings, and adductor muscles.

References 

Bodyweight exercises